The Central Pacific coastal forests is a temperate coniferous forest ecoregion located in the Canadian province of British Columbia and the U.S. states of Oregon and Washington, as defined by the World Wildlife Fund (WWF) categorization system.

Geography
The Central Pacific coastal forests stretch from the Chetco River in southwestern Oregon to the northern tip of Vancouver Island in British Columbia. It differs from the Coast Range ecoregion designated by the Environmental Protection Agency of the United States in that it includes the entirety of Vancouver Island and excludes the coastal forests of Northern California.

Major urban centers located within this ecoregion include Coos Bay, Astoria, Aberdeen, Victoria, Nanaimo, Courtenay, and Campbell River.

Climate
North of the Chehalis River Valley of Washington state, the ecoregion features a predominantly oceanic climate (Köppen Cfb) with cool winters, mild summers, and plentiful rainfall throughout the year. South of the Chehalis River Valley and along the east coast of Vancouver Island, the ecoregion has a predominantly Mediterranean climate (Köppen Csb) with fresh, dry, sunny summers and cool winters with moderate precipitation and plentiful cloud cover. Small patches of oceanic climate can be found in the Willapa Hills of Washington state and the northern highlands of the Oregon Coast Range.

Ecology

Flora

The forests of the Central Pacific Coast are among the most productive in the world, characterized by large trees draped lush growths of mosses and lichens, and an abundance of ferns, herbs, and woody debris on the forest floor.

The major forest complex consists of Douglas fir and western hemlock, encompassing seral forests dominated by Douglas fir and old-growth forests of fir, hemlock, western red cedar, and other species. These forests occur from sea level up to elevations of 700-1000 m in the Coast Range and Olympic Mountains. This forest type occupies a wide range of environments with variable composition and structure and includes such other species as grand fir, Sitka spruce, and western white pine.

On Vancouver Island, low-elevation coastal forest cover includes stands of western hemlock, Douglas-fir and amabilis fir. Western hemlock, Douglas fir and grand fir characterize most forests of eastern Vancouver Island. Drier sites support stands of western hemlock and western red cedar. The driest areas in eastern Vancouver Island consist of mixed stands of Douglas fir and western hemlock with occasional Garry oak, Pacific dogwood and arbutus. The subalpine forests are composed of mountain hemlock and amabilis fir, with some yellow cedar and western hemlock in high elevation areas in eastern Vancouver Island.

While hemlock and fir dominate much of the ecoregion, the cool, wet conditions along the coast create a narrow band of forests distinguished by Sitka spruce. With its high tolerance of salt spray, in areas near the ocean Sitka spruce may form nearly pure forests or co-dominate with lodgepole pine. The Sitka spruce zone–in which hemlocks also occur in large numbers–may be only a few kilometers in width and generally occurs below .

Riparian forests of this ecoregion are quite distinct from the Douglas-fir/hemlock forests. Broadleaf species such as black cottonwood and red alder replace the otherwise ubiquitous conifers along the many rivers and streams of the Pacific Northwest. Occasional grasslands, sand dune and strand communities, rush meadows and marshes, and western red cedar and alder swamps break up the conifer forests.

Fauna

The Central Pacific Coastal Forests are among the richest temperate coniferous forests in North America for amphibians and birds. Characteristic wildlife include Roosevelt elk, black-tailed deer, black bear, coyote, beaver, raccoon, mink, grouse, and a variety of migratory seabirds and waterfowl.

Conservation
Several relatively large blocks of more or less intact habitat remain, as do a number of smaller patches. Human activities have significantly altered nearly all habitats outside the parks.

Notable protected areas include:
Brooks Peninsula Provincial Park
Cape Scott Provincial Park
Carmanah Walbran Provincial Park
Elliott State Forest
Olympic National Park
Pacific Rim National Park Reserve
Strathcona Provincial Park

See also
Coast Range (EPA ecoregion)
List of ecoregions in Canada (WWF)
List of ecoregions in the United States (WWF)

References

External links

Nearctic ecoregions
Temperate coniferous forests
Ecoregions of Canada
Ecoregions of the United States
Pacific temperate rainforests